Fernando Jorge Tavares de Oliveira (born 19 September 1975), commonly known as Bock, is a Portuguese retired footballer who played as a striker.

He never played in the Primeira Liga in his professional career, which spanned nearly two decades, but appeared in 234 matches in the second division while scoring 71 goals, mostly with Freamunde.

Football career
Born in Vila Nova de Gaia, Porto District, Bock joined FC Porto's youth ranks at the age of 12 and, even though he excelled at goalscoring during his formative years, never received a first-team opportunity, being released in 1994 and taking his game to the third division, where he had one-season spells with F.C. Maia, Amarante FC and F.C. Lixa.

In the 1997–98 season, Bock had his first spell with what would be his main club, S.C. Freamunde, scoring 30 goals to help the side promote from the fourth level, one of two consecutive. In the following seven years he played almost exclusively in division three, with very brief stints in the second tier; in 2004–05 he netted 32 in 34 matches for Freamunde, who could not however promote to the latter category.

Bock's finest moment in the second division of Portuguese football came in the 2005–06 campaign, as he led the scoring charts to help F.C. Vizela finish in 11th position, at 19 goals. In the 2007 January transfer window the veteran returned to Freamunde with the club in that same tier from 2007–08 onwards, going on to feature regularly until his departure at the age of 37.

Club statistics

Honours

Club
Freamunde
Terceira Divisão: 1997–98
Segunda Divisão B: 1998–99, 2006–07

Leixões
Segunda Divisão B: 2002–03

Individual
Segunda Liga Top scorer: 2010–11
Segunda Liga Player of the Month: November 2010, February 2011

References

External links

1975 births
Living people
Sportspeople from Vila Nova de Gaia
Portuguese footballers
Association football forwards
Liga Portugal 2 players
Segunda Divisão players
F.C. Maia players
Amarante F.C. players
F.C. Lixa players
S.C. Freamunde players
C.D. Trofense players
F.C. Marco players
Ermesinde S.C. players
Gondomar S.C. players
Leixões S.C. players
F.C. Vizela players
G.D. Ribeirão players
Rebordosa A.C. players